The 2005 Buffalo Bills season was their 46th in the National Football League. The team was unable to improve upon their previous season’s output of 9–7, instead finishing 5–11. This was the sixth consecutive season in which the team missed the playoffs.

Mike Mularkey coached the Bills for his second year.

Offseason 
Drew Bledsoe, who had been the team’s quarterback from 2002–2004, was released by the Bills after the 2004 season to make way for backup quarterback J. P. Losman. It was the second time that Bledsoe’s team had let him go for a younger quarterback. When Bledsoe was later signed by the Dallas Cowboys, he expressed bitterness with the Bills for the move, stating "I can't wait to go home and dress my kids in little stars and get rid of the other team’s [Buffalo’s] stuff."

The Bills failed to re-sign defensive tackle Pat Williams, who would sign with the Minnesota Vikings for the 2005 season. The Bills also lost starting offensive tackle Jonas Jennings to the San Francisco 49ers.

Draft 

Buffalo had six draft picks in the 2005 draft. The Bills traded their only first round pick in 2005 to the Dallas Cowboys to move up in the previous draft, a pick they used to draft J. P. Losman.

Undrafted free agents

Personnel

Staff

Roster

Schedule 
In addition to their regular games with AFC East rivals, the Bills played teams from the AFC West and NFC South as per the schedule rotation, and also played intraconference games against the Bengals and the Texans based on divisional positions from 2004.

Standings

Season summary

Week 1 vs Texans

The Bills wore throwback AFL "standing buffalo" helmets
J.P. Losman 1st career start

References 

Buffalo Bills seasons
Buffalo Bills
Buff